FK Ilinden Skopje is a football club based in the Ilinden neighbourhood of Skopje, North Macedonia. They are currently competing in the Macedonian Third League (North Division).

History
The club was founded in 1958.

References

External links
Ilinden Skopje Facebook 
Club info at MacedonianFootball 
Football Federation of Macedonia 

Ilinden
Association football clubs established in 1958
1958 establishments in the Socialist Republic of Macedonia